The Bayer designation Zeta Scorpii (ζ Sco, ζ Scorpii) is shared by two stars in the constellation Scorpius:
 ζ¹ Scorpii (HD 152236.)
 ζ² Scorpii (HD 152334.)
They are separated by 7 arc minutes on the sky.  The stars are not physically related as they are at greatly different  distances from the Earth.

Both stars are members of asterism 尾 (Wěi), Tail, Tail mansion.

References

Scorpii, Zeta
Scorpius (constellation)